Mount Jefferson is located in Coos County, New Hampshire, and is the third highest mountain in the state.  The mountain is named after Thomas Jefferson, the third president of the United States, and is part of the Presidential Range of the White Mountains.  Mount Jefferson is flanked by Mount Adams (to the northeast) and Mount Clay (to the south).

The mountain has several interesting features, making it a popular hike. Two distinct ridges lead to its summit: Ridge of the Caps and Castle Ridge. The mountain is surrounded by the three dramatic glacial cirques of Jefferson Ravine, Castle Ravine, and the Great Gulf. Finally, Monticello Lawn is a large expanse of alpine sedge and rush near the otherwise talus-covered summit cone. When viewed from the Mount Washington Auto Road, Jefferson features an arrow-shaped bald patch pointing to its summit.

This route, gaining only  vertically to the summit, results in it having the least distance of ascent of any Presidential mountain (about 2.5 miles). However, climbing over the "caps" involves some exposed scrambling and can be steep and challenging at times.

See also

 List of mountains in New Hampshire
 four-thousand footers
 White Mountain National Forest
 List of people who died on the Presidential Range

References

External links
 
  PeakBagger.com: Mount Jefferson
  summitpost.org: Mount Jefferson
 AMC: Hiking Mount Jefferson
  hikethewhites.com: Mt Jefferson

Mountains of New Hampshire
White Mountains (New Hampshire)
Mountains of Coös County, New Hampshire